Ivaylovgrad Municipality is a municipality in Haskovo Province, Bulgaria. The administrative centre is Ivaylovgrad.

Religion
According to the latest Bulgarian census of 2011, the religious composition, among those who answered the optional question on religious identification, was the following:

References 

Municipalities in Haskovo Province